The Diego Sepúlveda Adobe (sometimes known as the Costa Mesa Estancia or the Santa Ana Estancia) is an adobe structure in Costa Mesa, Orange County, California.

History

The adobe was built between 1817 and 1823 to house the mayordomo and herdsmen who tended the cattle and horses from Mission San Juan Capistrano to the south, in Alta California. The way-station was strategically situated on the banks of the Santa Ana River, some six leguas (Spanish Leagues) north of the parent mission, to overlook cattle grazing lands and the Tongva villagers of Lupukngna.

It served as a lookout post when the French privateer Hippolyte de Bouchard attacked San Juan Capistrano on December 14, 1818. By 1820 the building and its surrounding lands became an official estancia (mission station), where padres from the mission would visit regularly to bring "spiritual food" to the faithful.

After the Mexican secularization act of 1833 the church lost the land and building to the originally Spanish, later Mexican-recognized land grant Rancho Santiago de Santa Ana. The adobe and its surrounding property, a portion of Rancho Santiago de Santa Ana, were deeded by the U.S. government to Diego Sepúlveda around 1868. He was a former alcalde of the Mexican era Pueblo of Los Angeles.

Present day
The adobe, which has been restored to its original style using original construction methods, is the second oldest building still standing in Orange County. The Mission San Juan Capistrano "Serra's Chapel" is the oldest.

The building then became a local history museum, operated by the Costa Mesa Historical Society.

See also
 List of Spanish missions in California
 History of Orange County, California
 California Historical Landmarks in Orange County, California
 Ranchos of Orange County, California
 USNS Mission Santa Ana (AO-137) — a Mission Buenaventura Class fleet oiler built during World War II.

Notes

References

External links
 Official Costa Mesa Historical Society website

Adobe buildings and structures in California
Buildings and structures in Costa Mesa, California
Historic house museums in California
Houses in Orange County, California
Museums in Orange County, California
1820 in Alta California
Houses completed in 1823
History of Orange County, California
California Historical Landmarks
1817 establishments in Alta California
Santa Ana River
Sepúlveda Adobe
Sepúlveda Adobe
Tourist attractions in Costa Mesa, California